Bhushan Patwardhan (born 1959) is a Distinguished Professor of Health Sciences, biomedical scientist, and ethnopharmacologist. He serves as the chairman of the Interdisciplinary AYUSH R&D Task Force on COVID-19 and India Lead, WHO Global Centre for Traditional Medicine Task Force. He is also member of the Lancet Citizens' Commission on Reimagining India’s Health System. Until March 4, 2021, Patwardhan served as the Vice Chairman of the University Grants Commission, New Delhi, and Chairman of the Indian Council of Social Science Research.

Early life and education 
Bhushan Patwardhan was born in 1959 to a middle-class family in Pune, Maharashtra, India. He attended Nutan Marathi Vidyalaya, and Fergusson College Pune where he studied chemistry. He received his Master of Science from Ahmednagar College and his PhD in Biochemistry from Savitribai Phule Pune University and the Haffkine Institute of Mumbai. Patwardhan's research was on traditional medicine, Ayurveda, and natural products. After attending university, he worked in the pharmaceutical industry to develop herbal medicines based on Ayurvedic teaching.

Academic career 
Patwardhan is National Research Professor-Ayush and a Distinguished Professor of Health Sciences at Savitribai Phule Pune University. He is also Adjunct Professor at NICM Health Research Institute, Western Sydney University, Australia. His main body of work has been in evidenced-based Ayurvedic teaching, ethnopharmacology, drug development, and the role of traditional medicines in public health.

He has delivered guest lectures on the national and international scale, including at the United Nations, the World Health Organization, and the Indian Pharmacological Society. Universities he has given guest lectures at include the University of California, the University of Illinois, George Washington University, Johns Hopkins University, MIT, and Harvard.

Patwardhan has served as the Director of the Interdisciplinary School of Health Sciences at Savitribai Phule Pune University, and the vice-chair of the University Grants Commission. He has served on the boards of several Indian universities, the Council for Scientific and Industrial Research, the Central Council for Research in Ayurvedic Sciences, and the Indian Council of Medical Research. He served as  Chairman Executive Committee, until March 6, 2023 National Assessment and Accreditation Council.

References

1959 births
Living people
Indian medical researchers
Academic staff of Savitribai Phule Pune University